Abdolaziz Farmanfarmaian (Persian: عبدالعزیز فرمانفرمائیان; Bam, 1920 – June 21, 2013 Barcelona,Spain) was an Iranian architect, offspring of Iranian nobleman Abdol Hossein Mirza Farmanfarma and a member of the Qajar dynasty of Iran. In 1976, the company known as AFFA (Abdol Aziz Farman-Farmaian and Associates) was created for the design of the Aryamehr Stadium which after the Iranian Revolution in 1979 was renamed to Azadi Stadium.

Biography

Abdol Aziz Farman-Farmaian was born is Shiraz in 1920 as the tenth son to Prince Abdol-Hossein Mirza Farmanfarma, at the time Governor General of the province of Shiraz.
In 1928, at the age of 8 he was sent to school in France, where he remained for his primary, and secondary school at Lycée Michelet in Paris until 1938. A brief trip to Iran during the short summer of 1935 was his first contact as an adolescent with his family.

His Baccalaureate degree was received in 1938. Abdol Aziz Farman-Farmaian and three other brothers were extremely lucky that their father, Prince Abdol Hossein Mirza, Had organized for them as guardian Mr. Desiré Roustan a leading French philosopher and writer. They in fact owe to him a happy childhood and excellent education away from home. Architectural studies were initiated in the École Spéciale d'Architecture, where he started to prepare for the Beaux Arts School. The onset of World War II broke the continuity of his studies and had to leave for Iran in 1940 where he stayed until 1945. During this period of worldwide uncertainty he worked at different jobs such as: Teheran Municipality, Karnsaks, and the Ministry of Culture (Vezarate Pishehonar).

In 1942 he married with Leila Gharagozlou and formed a family having a son.

After the end of World War II Abdol Aziz Farman-Farmaian came back to Paris with his family to continue his studies and was admitted at the Atelier of Mr. Nicot at the world-famous Ecole des Beaux Arts where he received his degree in 1950. The final project presented as his thesis was the design for a modern caravanserai to be situated in southern Iran. This project received the prize for the best thesis (diploma) of the year.

In 1950 Abdol Aziz Farman-Farmaian moved back to Teheran for good until 1979, where he proceeded to create one of Iran's most important modern-day architectural legacies.

The initial years—The Razmara period followed by the Mossadegh years—were marked by an unstable political and economic situation. Abdol Aziz Farman-Farmaian started to work as a civil servant at the university of Teheran in the Department of Construction where he became departmental director after a few years. During the same period he was given a professorial chair at the Teheran University school of Architecture (Daneshkadeh Honarhaie Ziba), where he taught students architecture until 1957–58.

In 1954 Abdol Aziz Farman-Farmaian was admitted by the Plan Organization as a recognized consultant, At this time when Abdol Aziz Farman-Farmaian designed numerous private residences for his extended relatives, friends and clients. The legal entity that was set up was known as Moassessehye Abdol Aziz Farman-Farmaian. In 1976, the company known as AFFA, Abdol Aziz Farman-Farmaian and Associates, was created for the design of the Stadium and in accordance with the directive of the Plan Organization to be associated with younger architects. The new associates were belonged to Reza Majd and Farokh Hirbod, both graduates from first-class American universities. AFFA's associates increased with the years.

Farman-Farmaian permanently moved to Paris in 1980 and afterwards to Spain, where he died aged 93. He was also in close contact with his partner Reza Majd, who still practiced architecture until recently in Palma, Mallorca, Spain.

Project list

In 1975 AFFA's rating in the plan organization was ranked first in Iran as a design and engineering consultant organization.

Works
Office buildings
 Ministry of Agriculture, 22 story headquarters office building, 1976
 National Iranian Oil Company Headquarters (in collaboration with Yahya Etehadieh), 13 story office in Tehran, 1961
 Telecommunication Center, 2 story tower in Tehran (sub-contract from Aneg), 1974
 Ministry of Roads, 14 story headquarter building, 1959
 National Iranian Television Center, Studios, offices and other facilities in Tehran, 1972
 Beh Shahr Group Office, Offices and other facilities, 1969
 Khaneh Center Commercial Complex, 3 three-story towers of 200,000 square metes half finished, 
 Bank Saderat Isfahan Branch Office, Banking facilities, 1978
 Bank Kar Building, 23-story building offices, 1960
 Bank Etebarat/Credit Lyonnais, Offices and banking facilities, 1968
 Oil Consortium Head Offices (in collaboration with Wilson, Mason and Partners), eight-story office building, 1960
 Cement Company Office, Built at the Plant, 1960

Teheran Olympic Center
 Track and field and football stadium, 100,000 seat stadium with all related facilities with an artificial lake at the north of the complex, 1970
 Multi purpose covered stadium (in collaboration with S.O.M San Francisco), 12,000 seat, 1979
 Covered swimming and diving pool (in collaboration with S.O.M San Francisco), 3,000 seat, 1974
 Office Building and press center, 1974
 Shooting range, Hand gun and rifles, 1974
 Trap shooting range, 1974
 Out door training fields, Hockey, track and field, 1974
 Out door tennis court and field hockey, For training purposes, 1974
 Connecting roads and bridges to main Karaj road, 1974

Hosting projects
 Saman 1 apartment building, Two 22-story towers with 170 apartment units, 1970
 Saman 2 tower apartment building, 3 thirteen-story towers, totaling 400 apartments, 1972
 Vanak Park Apartment Complex, 4 towards (6 & 20 story each), 1978
 Sarcheshmeh housing complex, 2,500 building units of single-family housing for the copper mining industry employees, 1978
 Polyacr residential community, Employee housing in 154 units, 1978
 Bid Boland housing project (U.I.O.E) (in collaboration with Yahya Etehadieh), 500 units of lousing for the gas pumping station workers, 1968 
 Khaneh Karaj, Different housing types recreational community, 1977
 Darya, Second Home Community 700 single family, 1977
 Isfahan, Single-family detached homes, townhouses, and apartments, 1978

Palaces
 New Niavaran Palace, 1967
 Old Niavaran Palace renovation, 1967
 Queen Mothe's Sad-abad residence, 1972
 Prince Mahmoud Reza's Sad-abad residence, 1965

Airports
 Mehr-abad Airport Expansions Program
 Apron, 38 aircraft positions with underground service road and underpass network, 1972
 Terminal N02, International passenger service facility, 1972
 Terminal N03, Facilities for Hajji Pilgrims leaving and returning, 1970
 Terminal N04, International passenger service facility, 1974
 Government Pavilion, Reception areas, lounges, kitchen, and dining facilities

Educational buildings
 Iran education project (in collaboration with Scandiacnsuk Intl-World Bank Project), Master planning, site selection, design and construction of 49 schools and colleges in 19 cities and towns in Iran, 1974
 University of Tehran
 Tehran School of engineering laboratories, Electro mechanical laboratories, 1965
 Atomic Energy Project for University of Tehran, 1965
 Technical school auditorium, 500 Seats, 1965
 School of agriculture hydraulics laboratories, 1958
 School of agriculture residential facilities, 1960
 School of veterinary sciences clinics, 1967
 School of science atomic research center, 1959
 Residential buildings for students in Amir-abad, 1959
 Restaurants for students in Amir-abad

Health and hospital
 Social Welfare Organization, Office building in 5 stories, 1964
 University of Ahwaz Hospital, 300-bed facility with doctors' training center, 1965
 Iranian army general hospital, Tehran, 200-bed hospital with a major surgical department, 1968
 Hospital, Abadan (in collaboration with Wilson, Mason and Partners), 250-bed facility with orthopedics and rehabilitation center, 1959

Miscellaneous
 Carpet Museum, 2 floors including exhibition hall, research library and carpet treatment facilities, 1978
 Iranian Pavilion, EXO 67, 8,000 square meter exhibition hall in a building with blue Isfahan tile exterior, 1957
 PIT postal sorting center (with the UK General Post Office), Automated central mail sorting complex, 1975
 Shemshak ski resort hotel, 30 rooms with sport resort facilities plus restaurant and locker rooms

Industrial buildings
 Arj industrial complexes, 20,000 square meter factory and shop facility plus 5,000 square meters of office space units of staff apartments, 1965
 Darou Pakhsh Group Pharmaceutical Plan (with Wilson, Mason and Partners), 20,000 square meters of plant, laboratories and offices 300, 1965
 Pfizer pharmaceutical center (with Wilson, Mason and Partners), 8,000 square meters of offices, 1965
 Squibb industrial offices (with Wilson, Mason and Partners), 7,000 square meters offices, 1965
 Shopping center of the Iranian army, 20,000 square meters in 3 floors plus basement level, 1966
 Telecommunication and earth satellite station for Northup Page Communications, 1970

Master plans
 Comprehensive master plan of Tehran (with Gruen Associates), 25 years growth plan and policies, capital improvement program, land use and development controls regarding direction of growth for capital of 5.5 million population, arranged in 10 linear towns along an east-west axis, major rejuvenation of residential and southern sectors of Tehran
 Lavizan New Town, Master plan of 3,200 hectares for 280,000 population community on east axis of Tehran, 1977
 Sarcheshmeh Community, 2,500 units, Residential development for the copper mining industries staff, 1978
 Khaneh Community Development
 Isfahan, 140 hectare development for a community of 15,000 persons, 1978
 Darya, Resort community on 250 hectares extensive beach from
 Karaj, Second home community for 700 single-family units on 63 hectares, 1977
 Greater Tehran Parking Study, Study of the potential for development of underground public parking structures in major squares throughout central Tehran, 1969
 Note1, between years 1950 and 1965 construction of 100 houses for friends and family. Some of these houses have been destroyed. Residence of the Belgian Ambassador still exists.
 Note2, Since 1955 up to 1970, all now basic work for Oil Operating Company (Consortium), as schools, houses, clubs houses, hospital, clinics, etc. has been designed and built by AFFA and Wilson & Masons of London.
 Note3, Designed but not built, New Tehran International Airport-Terminal Building and about 100 different support facilities, (in collaboration with T.A.M.S New York), Construction of runways, started in 1978
 Air Force Academy near Isfahan (in collaboration with S.O.M Chicago Office)
 Royal House Society and Hippodrome
 Central Bank of Iran and Crown Jewels Museum in Abbas-abad, Tehran

Tehran Master Plan
Partnered with the American firm of Victor Gruen Associates, Farmanfarmaian proposed his most important project, the Master plan of Tehran. This comprehensive plan, which was approved in 1968, identified the city problems to be high density, expansion of new suburbs, air and water pollution, inefficient infrastructure, unemployment, and rural-urban migration. To deal with these problems, the consortium envisioned a 25-year planning horizon which encouraged reducing the density and congestion of the city center through polycentric developments around Tehran. Eventually, the whole plan was 'marginalized' by the 1979 Iranian Revolution and the subsequent Iran–Iraq War.

See also
 Azadi Stadium

References

Daughter of Persia; Sattareh Farman Farmaian with Dona Munker; Crown Publishers, Inc., New York, 1992.

External links 
 Abdol Aziz Farman Farmaian. Biography
The Qajar (Kadjar) Pages
Qajars Dynasty Turkoman dynasty of the Shahs of Persia

Qajar princes
1920 births
2013 deaths
Iranian architects
École des Beaux-Arts alumni
Iranian emigrants to France
Iranian emigrants to Spain
People from Shiraz
Exiles of the Iranian Revolution in France
Exiles of the Iranian Revolution in Spain
École Spéciale d'Architecture alumni
Farmanfarmaian family